Vinod Khosla (born 28 January 1955) is an Indian-American businessman and venture capitalist. He is a co-founder of Sun Microsystems and the founder of Khosla Ventures. Khosla made his wealth from early venture capital investments in areas such as networking, software, and alternative energy technologies. He is considered one of the most successful and influential venture capitalists.

In 2014, Forbes counted him among the 400 richest people in the United States. In 2021, he was ranked 92nd on the Forbes 400 list.

Biography 
Khosla was born on January 28, 1955, in Pune, India. Khosla's father was an officer in the Indian Army and was posted at New Delhi, India. His father wanted him to also join the army. He attended Mount St Mary's School for elementary school. Khosla became interested in entrepreneurship after reading about the founding of Intel in Electronic Engineering Times as a teenager, and this inspired him to pursue technology as a career. According to Khosla, he was inspired by Intel co-founder Andrew Grove, a Hungarian immigrant that got funding for Intel in Silicon Valley, when it was a startup.

From 1971-76, Khosla attended IIT Delhi where he earned a bachelor's degree in electrical engineering. He started the first computer club in any IIT to do computer programming and operated the school's computer center while the operations staff were on strike. He also wrote a paper on parallel processing as a teenager before the concept was adopted by the IT industry, and helped to start the first biomedical engineering program in India. In 1975, Khosla attempted to start a soy milk company intended to provide a milk alternative to Indian consumers that do not have refrigerators to preserve cow milk.

Khosla received a master's in biomedical engineering from Carnegie Mellon University on a full scholarship. He applied to Stanford University's MBA program but was rejected for lack of work experience. He had two full time jobs while finishing his master’s for the two years of work experience, but was rejected a second time. Three weeks into starting at Carnegie Mellon for his MBA, Khosla convinced the admissions staff to accept him into Stanford Graduate School of Business and received an MBA in 1980.

He is married to Neeru Khosla, his childhood girlfriend. They have four children.

Career

Early businesses and investments 
After completing his MBA at Stanford in 1980, Khosla developed a business plan for an electronic design automation company for electrical engineers. He was introduced to employees at Intel and became the first full-time founder and Chief Financial Officer of Daisy Systems. The company spent 80 percent of its resources on building custom computer hardware that could run its software. As a result, Khosla left the company in order to create a startup that manufactures general purpose computers. In 1981, Khosla co-founded Data Dump with a former Stanford classmate, which ended up failing.

In 1982, Khosla co-founded Sun Microsystems (SUN is the acronym for the Stanford University Network), along with Stanford classmates Scott McNealy, Andy Bechtolsheim, who was licensing a computer design to local companies. UC Berkeley computer science graduate student Bill Joy later joined the company as co-founder. Sun Microsystems sold servers to the universities they graduated from and other colleges, desktop computers, and created the Java programming language. Khosla raised $300,000 in seed capital from venture capital firm Kleiner Perkins Caufield & Byers. Within five years, Sun made $1 billion in annual sales. Khosla also recruited early executives and developers such as Eric Schmidt and Carol Bartz. He served as the first chairman and CEO from 1982 to 1984, when he left the company to become a venture capitalist.

In 1986, Khosla joined the venture capital firm Kleiner Perkins as a general partner. At Kleiner Perkins, Khosla managed investments in technologies, such as video games and semiconductors.

He helped create Nexgen, sold to AMD for 28 percent of its market cap, which was the first successful Intel microprocessor clone company. He invested in Go Corporation, which developed a stylus-operated computer and was seen as one of the largest Silicon Valley startup failures. In 1994, he suggested that Excite adapt its search engine for the internet and helped finance the special disk drive the company needed to run their search engine. He mentored the founders until the company was sold to @Home for $7 billion, which was it his first venture capital deal of that size. Afterwards, Khosla was an early proponent of fiber optics and the internet for faster communication and started focusing on telecommunication networking companies.

He incubated Juniper Networks and suggested that it develop an "Internet router instead of the plain vanilla router mostly used." Khosla invested $275,000, which became his largest return on investment to date. A $3 million investment in Juniper Networks in the 1990s earned $7 billion for Kleiner Perkins according to The Wall Street Journal. He also incubated Cerent Corporation in 1996, which sold to Cisco for $7.8 billion, and Siara, which sold for $3 billion and was its chief executive officer for its first year.

Development of Khosla Ventures 
In 2004 to spend more time with his teenage kids and focus on technology startups, Khosla moved to part-time and eventually left Kleiner Perkins. He founded his own venture capital firm, Khosla Ventures later that year as a way to invest in more experimental technologies with a "social impact." At the time, he had about $1.5 billion from co-founding Sun Microsystems and his work with Kleiner Perkins. The firm is based in Menlo Park, California.

Khosla was featured on Dateline NBC in May 2006, where he discussed the practicality of ethanol as a gasoline substitute. He has invested heavily in ethanol companies.

The firm became known for large, early investments in alternative energy technology like solar, biofuel, and batteries. He has advocated for breakthroughs in these "clean" energies rather than cutting back on energy consumption. The firm incubated carbon recycling and aviation fuel company LanzaTech and QuantumScape, a solid state battery company. Khosla has stated both Quantumscape and Lanzatech are unicorns that have taken time and calls them part of "clean tech 1.0." He believes carbon sequestration is an area that needs significant advancements and is the most feasible. Impossible Foods, which works to make meat a more efficient energy source, and View Glass are also unicorns incubated by Khosla Ventures. Business Insider reported that it took 10 years to return "more than a billion dollars" to the firm, similar to some of Khosla's other successful investments that also took a decade to pay off. Khosla believes that a dozen dramatic technologies to solve climate change and it is inaccurate to continue cleantech investing as a bust.

In September 2009, Khosla Ventures III secured $750 million of investor commitments to invest in traditional early-stage and growth-stage companies. Khosla also raised $250 million for Khosla Seed, which will invest in higher-risk opportunities. He opened up Khosla Ventures to outside investors for the first time that same year.

Beginning in 2010, Khosla Ventures began investing in food and was the first investor in companies like Instacart and DoorDash. Fintech was also an area of focus with early investments. In May 2010, it was announced that former British Prime Minister Tony Blair was to join Khosla Ventures to provide strategic advice regarding investments in technologies focused on the environment. During this time, Khosla had hired Condoleezza Rice's advisory firm to work with portfolio companies. In 2012, Khosla wrote an article titled "Do We Need Doctors Or Algorithms?" arguing the increasing importance of artificial intelligence in medicine claiming "bionic assistance" will eventually replace most doctors. He started investing in medicine and robotics, such as companies that use artificial intelligence in medical treatments at that time. Khosla Ventures also invested in HackerRank.

In 2018, Khosla stated the plan for the rest of his life was to "reinvent societal infrastructure" through innovation and technology such as 3D-printing houses for the homeless. Khosla has stated "we need 1,000% change if billions of people in China and India are to enjoy a Western, energy-rich lifestyle." He invests in "black swan" technologies that have a high chance of failure but if successful, would have environmental and societal benefits. In 2019, Khosla presented "Amazing: What KV Founders are Doing," which described 100 portfolio companies reinventing areas such as health, infrastructure, robotics, transportation, augmented reality and artificial intelligence.

Khosla Ventures manages approximately $15 billion of investor capital as well as investments funded by Khosla himself.

Views

Capitalism 
Khosla believes in using capitalism as a solution for social impact due to its ability to scale, which is something he does not believe is possible with non-profit organizations. He has insisted economical, large-scale solutions will succeed when facing global warming as well. Khosla has stated that machine learning technology will replace many jobs and increase income disparities however will also create enough GDP to provide basic income to everyone.

Politics 
Khosla has donated to a mix of Democrats and Republicans and supports politicians based on their climate policies. He is a Democrat and has donated to organizations that support left-leaning politics. In 2013, Khosla hosted Barack Obama for a fundraising dinner at his home in Portola Valley.

Khosla was a major proponent of the "Yes on 87" campaign to pass California's Proposition 87, The Clean Energy Initiative, which failed to pass in November 2006.

Khosla endorsed Democratic candidate Hillary Clinton in the 2016 U.S. presidential election.

Philanthropy and affiliations 
Khosla was honorary chair of the DonorsChoose San Francisco Bay Area advisory board. In 2000, Khosla was a recipient of the Golden Plate Award of the American Academy of Achievement. In 2006, Khosla's wife Neeru co-founded the CK-12 Foundation, which aims to develop open-source textbooks and lower the cost of education in the US and the rest of the world. Khosla and his wife are donors to the Wikimedia Foundation, in the amount of $600,000.

In 2007, Khosla was an award recipient in the Northern California region for the EY Entrepreneur of the Year award. Khosla was a member of the board of trustees of the Blum Center for Developing Economies at the University of California, Berkeley. The center is focused on finding solutions to address the crisis of extreme poverty and disease in the developing world. He is an advisor for HackerRank, a website for competitive coding.

He is also one of the founders of TiE, The Indus Entrepreneurs, and has guest-edited a special issue of The Economic Times, a business newspaper in India.

He is involved with organizations that provide microfinancing to small businesses in third-world countries and other organizations that promote entrepreneurship. Khosla is on the Board of Trustees at Carnegie Mellon University. Khosla was an early signatory to the Giving Pledge and sits on the Breakthrough Energy Ventures board.

In April 2021, Khosla made an offer to fund oxygen imports for hospitals in India amid the ongoing COVID-19 pandemic.

Martins Beach dispute 
Since 2010, Khosla has been engaged in a legal dispute regarding public access to Martins Beach, several miles south of Half Moon Bay, California, where he owns adjacent land. Martins Beach was a popular family beach and surf spot before Khosla purchased the property adjacent to the beach and blocked access with a gate, armed guards at the road entrance and painting over the welcome sign.

In August 2017, a Californian court of appeals ruled that Khosla must restore public access to Martins Beach. The plaintiffs stated that they expected Khosla to take the case to the US Supreme Court. In October 2018, the Supreme Court announced that it would not hear the appeal of the California appeals court decision. In November 2018, a San Mateo County court found that the prior owners of the property had not intended for access to Martins Beach to be public. In January 2020, the California Coastal Commission sued Khosla, alleging he was in violation of the California Coastal Act of 1976.

References

External links 
 
  (2006-03-29)

1955 births
20th-century American businesspeople
21st-century philanthropists
21st-century American businesspeople
American billionaires
American technology chief executives
American people of Punjabi descent
American technology company founders
Carnegie Mellon University College of Engineering alumni
Carnegie Mellon University trustees
American venture capitalists
American chairpersons of corporations
Businesspeople from Delhi
Giving Pledgers
Indian company founders
Indian emigrants to the United States
IIT Delhi alumni
Living people
Stanford Graduate School of Business alumni
Sun Microsystems people
Kleiner Perkins people
American people of Indian descent
American computer businesspeople
American chief executives
American chief executives of Fortune 500 companies
Chief executives in the technology industry